Paulo Mendonça is a Swedish funk guitarist songwriter and composer of Portuguese origin. He has released five studio albums and one live album, the first three in the 1990s  as a performing artist and sold more than 250.000 copies and as a songwriter he received 8x platinum awards. In 1996 he particiapted at the Montreux Jazz Festival. He toured with Tina Turner among others. In 2008, he collaborated on Jeff Scott Soto's album, Beautiful mess. In 2010 Mendonca worked on several songs on the HURTS Album "Happiness" as a guitarist and background vocalist. In 2013, he released Does anybody wanna funk? which featured the song Birds and the bees, a moderate success in Sweden and Germany 

He was one of the first musicians ever to collaborate with the Swatch Group to provide tunes for its Melody line of wristwatches. His latest collaboration with Swatch is the PAULO MENDONCA-11 PM model, from the Winter 2013 collection. In 2017 he co-wrote the song "Funky Song" for the polish singer Margaret.

Discography

Albums

Singles

Discography and certifications as songwriter 
A discography of songs written and/or produced by Paulo Mendonca.

References

External links 
 Official site
 YouTube page

Year of birth missing (living people)
Living people
Brazilian guitarists
Brazilian bass guitarists
Male bass guitarists

Swedish people of Portuguese descent